The 57th Weather Reconnaissance Squadron is an inactive United States Air Force squadron.   Its last assignment was with the 9th Weather Reconnaissance Wing at Hickam Air Force Base, Hawaii, where it was inactivated on 10 November 1969.

History

World War II
Activated in early 1943 under Fourth Air Force; spent World War II in the United States as an Operational Training Unit, initially equipped with Bell P-39 Airacobras for advanced fighter training.  Reassigned to Third Air Force in 1944, becoming a Replacement Training Unit for North American A-36 Apache fighter-dive bomber ground attack aircraft.

The squadron moved to Stuttgart Army Air Field Arkansas in 1945 and realigned into a long-range strategic weather reconnaissance squadron, training with B-25 Mitchells and long-ranger P-61C Black Widow Night Fighters modified for weather reconnaissance missions.   Moved to Rapid City Army Air Field, South Dakota in late 1945, using P-61Cs as part of a NACA/Air Weather Service Thunderstorm Project to learn more about thunderstorms and to use this knowledge to better protect civil and military airplanes that operated in their vicinity. The Northrop P-61 Black Widow's radar and particular flight characteristics enabled it to find and penetrate the most turbulent regions of a storm, and return crew and instruments intact for detailed study.  Inactivated in 1946 as part of the general demobilization of the Army Air Forces.

Reserve reconnaissance unit
The squadron was activated in the reserve in July 1947 at Hamilton Field.  However, it is not clear that it was manned or equipped beyond a token cadre before President Truman's reduced 1949 defense budget required reductions in the number units in the Air Force, and the squadron was inactivated in June 1949.

Weather reconnaissance
Reactivated in 1951 in Hawaii, Equipped with very long range Boeing WB-29 Superfortresses, upgrading to extended long-range Boeing WB-50D Superfortresses in 1956.  Conducted long-range weather flights over the Arctic and along the northern periphery of the Soviet Union; the aircraft being equipped with sensors for detecting radioactive debris to gather evidence when the Soviets tested nuclear devices.  Inactivated in 1958 as part of the phaseout of the WB-50s and development of faster jet aircraft for the long-range intelligence mission.

Reactivated in 1962 at Kirtland Air Force Base, New Mexico.  Beginning in 1963 began to be equipped with new high-altitude reconnaissance Martin RB-57F Canberra aircraft  modified for high altitude, long range intelligence gathering, assigned to the meteorological role.   Part of their duties involved high-altitude atmospheric sampling and radiation detection work in support of nuclear test monitoring.   Over the next decade the RB-57Fs were flown on a worldwide basis at very high altitudes at high speeds; the squadron being moved to Australia, then to Hawaii.  Stress cracks began appearing in the wing spars and ribs of the RB-57Fs after a few years of service. Some were sent to General Dynamics for repairs.   By 1969 the aircraft were basically worn out and they were flown to Davis-Monthan Air Force Base for storage.    Squadron was then inactivated.

Lineage
 Constituted as the 399th Fighter Squadron on 26 May 1943
 Activated on 1 August 1943
 Redesignated 399th Fighter-Bomber Squadron on 5 April 1944
 Redesignated 399th Fighter Squadron on 5 June 1944
 Redesignated 57th Reconnaissance Squadron, Weather on 7 July 1945
 Inactivated on 25 January 1946
 Redesignated 57th Reconnaissance Squadron, Very Long Range, Weather on 3 July 1947
 Activated in the reserve on 1 August 1947
 Inactivated on 27 June 1949
 Redesignated 57th Strategic Reconnaissance Squadron, Medium, Weather on 22 January 1951
 Activated on 21 February 1951
 Redesignated 57th Weather Reconnaissance Squadron on 15 February 1954
 Inactivated on 18 October 1958
 Activated on 8 February 1962 (not organized)
 Organized on 16 February 1962
 Inactivated 10 November 1969

Assignments
 369th Fighter Group, 1 August 1943
 Third Air Force, 7 July 1945
 III Reconnaissance Command, 21 July 1945 – 25 January 1946
 70th Reconnaissance Group, 1 August 1947 – 27 June 1949
 Air Weather Service, 21 February 1951
 2142d Air Weather Wing, 20 May 1951
 1st Weather Wing, 8 February 1954 – 18 October 1958
 Military Air Transport Service, 8 February 1962 (not organized)
 9th Weather Reconnaissance Group, 16 February 1962
 9th Weather Reconnaissance Wing, 8 July 1965 – 10 November 1969

Stations
 Hamilton Field, California, 1 August 1943
 Redding Army Air Field, California, 1 November 1943
 Hamilton Field, California, 16 March 1944
 DeRidder Army Air Base Louisiana, 28 March 1944
 Stuttgart Army Air Field, Arkansas, 8 February 1945
 Will Rogers Field, Oklahoma, 21 July 1945
 Rapid City Army Air Field, South Dakota, 29 July 1945 – 25 January 1946
 Hamilton Field (later Hamilton Air Force Base), California, 1 August 1947 – 27 June 1949
 Hickam Air Force Base, Hawaii, 21 February 1951 – 18 October 1958
 Kirtland Air Force Base, New Mexico, 16 February 1962
 RAAF Laverton, Victoria, Australia, September 1963 - 8 July 1965
 Avalon Airport, Victoria, Australia, 8 July 1965
 Hickam Air Force Base, Hawaii, 15 September 1965 – 10 November 1969

Aircraft

 Bell P-39 Airacobra, 1943–1944
 North American A-36 Apache, 1944
 Curtiss P-40 Warhawk, 1944–1945
 North American B-25 Mitchell, 1945
 Northrop P-61C Black Widow, 1945
 Boeing WB-29 Superfortress, 1951–1956
 Boeing WB-50 Superfortress, 1956–1958
 Martin WB-57F Canberra, 1962–1969
 Boeing WB-47E Stratojet, 1966-1969
 WC-130B Hercules 1963
 Lockheed U-2 c. 1963

References

 Notes

 Citations

Bibliography

 
 
 
 
 

057
Military units and formations in Hawaii